The Congressional Friends of Ireland, or Friends of Ireland, is an organization in the United States Congress that was founded in 1981 by Irish-American politicians Senator Ted Kennedy, Senator Daniel Moynihan and House Speaker Tip O'Neill to support initiatives for peace and reconciliation in Northern Ireland.

"The Friends of Ireland is a bipartisan group of Senators and Representatives opposed to violence and terrorism in Northern Ireland and dedicated to maintaining a United States policy that promotes a just, lasting, and peaceful settlement of the conflict that has cost more than 3,100 lives over the past quarter century", according to a statement by Kennedy in the Senate on 22 March 1994.

Representative Richard Neal (D-Massachusetts) is the current chair of this bipartisan group of senators and representatives. In chapter 9 of his book "Irish America and the Ulster Conflict 1968-1995," (Blackstaff Press, 1995) Andrew J. Wilson writes that the Congressional Friends of Ireland played a significant role in the Anglo-Irish Agreement of 1985.

Prior to the formation of the caucus in 1981, the phrase "Congressional friends of Ireland" was in use in the United States as early as 1920 when The New York Times wrote, "An editorial article in the current issue of The Freeman gives the Congressional friends of Ireland and the Irish vote a gentle but somewhat disconcerting prod."

Each year in March, the Irish Taoiseach visits the United States for Saint Patrick's Day. A Shamrock Ceremony takes place in the morning at the White House where a crystal bowl containing shamrock, a traditional symbol of Ireland, is presented to the President in the Oval Office. This is followed by a Friends of Ireland luncheon hosted by the House Speaker in the U.S. Capitol or the Rayburn House Office Building. The luncheon is attended by the President, Vice President, the Taoiseach, the Speaker, and other officials. In the evening, a Saint Patrick's Day Reception takes place at the White House.

References

Further reading
 The Congressional Friends of Ireland and the Anglo-Irish Agreement, 1981-1985, by Andrew J. Wilson

Political organizations based in the United States
Irish-American culture
Caucuses of the United States Congress
Ireland–United States relations
Politics of Ireland
United Kingdom–United States relations
United States friendship associations
1981 establishments in Washington, D.C.
Organizations established in 1981